The governor-general of Saint Lucia is the representative of the Saint Lucian monarch, currently Charles III. The official residence of the governor-general is Government House.

The position of governor-general was established when Saint Lucia was granted independence on 22 February 1979.

List of Governors-General of Saint Lucia
Following is a list of people who have served as Governor-General of Saint Lucia since independence in 1979.

Constitutional powers, functions and duties

The office of governor-general is provided for by Chapter II, Sections 19 to 22 of the Constitution. These state:
19.- There shall be a Governor-General of Saint Lucia who shall be a citizen appointed by Her Majesty and shall hold office during Her Majesty's pleasure and who shall be Her Majesty's representative in Saint Lucia.
20.-
1. During any period when the office of Governor-General is vacant of the holder of the office of Governor-General is absent from Saint Lucia or is for any other reason unable to perform the functions of his office those functions shall be performed by such person as Her Majesty may appoint.
2. Any such person as aforesaid shall not continue to perform the function of the office of Governor-General if the holder of the office of Governor-General or some other person having a prior right to perform the functions of that office has notified him that he is about to assume or resume those functions.
3. The holder of the office of Governor-General shall not, for the purposes of this section, be regarded as absent from Saint Lucia or as unable to perform the function of his office-
a. by reason that he is in passage from one part of Saint Lucia to another; or
b. at any time when there is a subsisting appointment of a deputy under section 22 of this Constitution.
21.- A persons appointed to hold the office of Governor-General shall, before entering upon the duties of that office, take and subscribe the oath of allegiance and the oath of office.
22.-
1. Whenever the Governor-General-
a. has occasion to be absent from the seat of government by not from Saint Lucia;
b. has occasion to be absent from Saint Lucia for a period which he considers, acting in his own deliberate judgment, will be of short duration; or
c. is suffering from an illness which he considers, acting in his own deliberate judgment, will be of short duration,
he may, acting in accordance with the advice of the Prime Minister, appoint any person in Saint Lucia to be his deputy during such absence or illness and in that capacity to perform on his behalf such of the function of the office of Governor-General as may be specified in the instrument by which he is appointed.
2. The power and authority of the Governor-General shall not be abridged, altered or in any way affected by the appointment of a deputy under this section, and, subject to the provisions of this Constitution, a deputy shall conform to and observe all instructions that the Governor-General, acting in his own deliberate judgment, may from time to time address to him:
provided that the question whether or not a deputy has conformed to and observed any such instructions shall not be enquired into by any court of law.
3. A person appointed as deputy under this section shall hold that appointment for such period as may be specified in the instrument by which he is appointed, and his appointment may be revoked at any time by the Governor-General, acting in accordance with the advice of the Prime Minister.

See also

 List of prime ministers of Saint Lucia
 List of colonial governors and administrators of Saint Lucia

References

Rulers.org

External links

 Head of State, Saint Lucia
 Office of the Governor-General of St Lucia

Saint Lucia, Governors-General
Politics of Saint Lucia
Government of Saint Lucia
Governors-General
 
1979 establishments in Saint Lucia
Saint Lucia and the Commonwealth of Nations